Krousonas is a village and a former municipality in the Heraklion regional unit, Crete, Greece. Since the 2011 local government reform it is part of the municipality Malevizi, of which it is a municipal unit. Population 2,776 (2011).

References

Populated places in Heraklion (regional unit)